Celio Roberto Roncancio González (March 12, 1966 – June 8, 2014 in Manizales, Caldas) was a male road racing cyclist from Colombia, who was a professional rider from 1988 to 1997.

Career
   
1994
3rd in Stage 5 Vuelta a Colombia, Manizales (COL)
4th in General Classification Vuelta a Colombia (COL)
1995
2nd in  National Championships, Road, Elite, Colombia (COL)
6th in General Classification Clásico RCN (COL)
1996
1st in  National Championships, Road, Elite, Colombia (COL)
5th in General Classification Clásico RCN (COL)
1997
3rd in Stage 11 Vuelta a Colombia, Puerto Salgar (COL)
10th in General Classification Clásico RCN (COL)

References
 

1966 births
2014 deaths
Colombian male cyclists
People from Caldas Department
20th-century Colombian people